Chastain is an unincorporated community in Thomas County, in the U.S. state of Georgia.

History
A post office called Chastain was established in 1880, and remained in operation until 1907. The community was named after one or more early settlers with the surname Chastain.

References

Unincorporated communities in Thomas County, Georgia